Bernard Deay (born 14 July 1991) is an Irish hurler who plays as a left wing-forward for the Kildare senior team.

Born in the United States, Deay made his senior debut for Kildare in the 2013 Christy Ring Cup. He has gone on to play a key role for the team since then, and has won one Christy Ring Cup medal.

At club level Deay plays with Clane.

Honours

Team

Kildare
Christy Ring Cup (2): 2014/2107

References

1991 births
Living people
Kildare inter-county hurlers
Place of birth missing (living people)
Clane hurlers